Paul Hansen (December 6, 1928 – January 18, 1993) was an American basketball coach.  He was the head men's basketball coach at Oklahoma City University, Oklahoma State University–Stillwater, and University of Science and Arts of Oklahoma (USAO). Prior to the becoming a head coach, he acted as an assistant to iconic Oklahoma City University coach, Abe Lemons for 18 seasons. Hansen, born in Iowa, but raised in Oklahoma City, played college basketball at the Oklahoma City University. He began his coaching career at Noble High School, before returning to his alma mater. After Lemmons left OCU to coach  Pan American, Hansen moved into the lead role. Hansen led Oklahoma City to three consecutive winning seasons, where he coached Allen Leavell who went onto 10 seasons in the  NBA. Hansen then became Oklahoma State's head men's basketball coach in 1979. He led the Cowboys to their first 20 win season and  NCAA tournament appearance since 1965. Hansen was let go from the Cowboys in 1986 and became the head coach at University of Science and Arts of Oklahoma in Chickasha, Oklahoma. He guided the USAO Drovers through 1991 before retiring. Hansen died on January 18, 1993; he was 64 years old. Paul Hansen was married and he and his wife, Carol, had five daughters, Elizabeth, Patti, Judith, Mary and Heidi.

College Head Coaching Record

References

External links
 

1928 births
1993 deaths
American men's basketball coaches
American men's basketball players
Basketball coaches from Oklahoma
Basketball players from Oklahoma
College men's basketball head coaches in the United States
High school basketball coaches in Oklahoma
Oklahoma State Cowboys basketball coaches
Oklahoma City Stars men's basketball coaches
Oklahoma City Stars men's basketball players
People from Hull, Iowa
Sportspeople from Oklahoma City
Sportspeople from Iowa